Gemma Alexandra Figtree  is an Interventional Cardiologist at Royal North Shore Hospital, Professor in Medicine at the University of Sydney, chair of the Federal Government's 10-year Mission  for Cardiovascular Health, and co-leader of the Cardiovascular Theme for Sydney Health Partners.

Career 

Figtree has dedicated her career to unravelling key mechanisms of heart attack susceptibility, combining clinical work as an interventional cardiologist with laboratory research, large cohort studies, and clinical trials.

As a Rhodes Scholar at Oxford University, Figtree's cardiovascular research led to fundamental discoveries about estrogen and NO/redox regulation. Her research focuses on improving prediction, prevention and treatment of cardiovascular disease and heart attacks, inspired by her clinical work as an interventional cardiologist.

Research 
Discoveries in her laboratory have been published in leading peer-reviewed journals, with over 190 publications cited ~9250 times. Driven by patient care as an interventional cardiologist, Figtree's research reflects bench-to-bedside knowledge translation of molecular discoveries to the clinic, and her work with health digital twin technology contributes to advances in precision medicine.

As a cardiologist spokesperson, Figtree has been recognized for her work with baby heart conditions, cardiovascular disease, and heart attacks in people who are not identified as "at risk", and leads the Federal Mission for Cardiovascular Health.

Selected publications

Awards 
Figtree was appointed a Member of the Order of Australia in the 2023 Australia Day Honours.

She was awarded a National Health and Medical Research Council (NHMRC) Excellence Award for Top Ranked Practitioner Fellow (Australia), commencing in 2018. In 2019 and 2020 she received the prestigious NSW Ministerial Award for Cardiovascular Research Excellence.

References

External links 
 Gemma Figtree

Living people
Australian cardiologists
Members of the Order of Australia
Academic staff of the University of Sydney
Australian Rhodes Scholars
Year of birth missing (living people)